ZTS may refer to:
 Zoetis (NYSE symbol ZTS), an American drug company
 Tahsis Water Aerodrome (IATA code ZTS), in British Columbia, Canada
 Zero trust security